Okkar Min (born 4 November  1984) is a Burmese politician who served as a House of Nationalities member of parliament for Tanintharyi No. 8 constituency from 2016 until his removal from office in the 2021 Myanmar coup d'état. He is a member of the National League for Democracy.

Early life and education 
Okkar was born on 4 November  1984 in Yangon, Myanmar. He graduated B.Sc(Maths) from Myeik University.

Political career
Okkar was elected as an Amyotha Hluttaw MP, winning a majority of 46,420 votes from Tanintharyi Region No.8 parliamentary constituency.

He also served as a member of Amyotha Hluttaw Local and Overseas Employment Committee.

References

National League for Democracy politicians
1984 births
Living people
People from Yangon